Elizabeth Allen is a poet from Australia. Her poetry has been published in several Australian literary journals and magazines including HEAT, Hermes, Hobo and Southerly. Her 2012 book, Body Language, won the Anne Elder Award.

Works

Poems 
At Winton
News from home
Statistic
Wet Sunday afternoon
Two years on
Bloom
Corner
Dying
I lie down
Present
I do not know what shape
Your life
Walking to Greenwich Baths
The School Teacher

Collections 
 Forgetful Hands (Vagabond Press, 2005)
 Body Language (Vagabond Press, 2012)
 Present (Vagabond Press, 2017)

References

External links 

 

Australian women poets
Living people
Year of birth missing (living people)
21st-century Australian poets
21st-century Australian women writers
People educated at Redlands, Cremorne